State Road 508 (SR 508), also known as NASA Boulevard, is a  east–west road in Melbourne.  It extends from Eddie Allen Road next to the Melbourne International Airport exit east to U.S. Route 1 (US 1 or SR 5).

Major intersections

References

External links

508
State Roads in Melbourne, Florida